Erin Nicole Nayler (born 17 April 1992) is a New Zealand association football goalkeeper, playing for Umeå IK of the Elitettan. She has represented New Zealand at international level.

Early life
Nayler started playing as a goalkeeper at the age of 10. Playing for Westlake Girls High School with her father Mark as coach, Nayler won many Secondary School tournaments before graduating in 2009. Afterwards she went to Indiana University – Purdue University Fort Wayne in 2010, spending one year playing for the IPFW Mastodons and studying biology. She is currently studying Molecular Biology at Massey University.

Career
Nayler was a member of the New Zealand U-20 side at the 2010 and 2012 Women's World Championships, playing in all three of New Zealand's group games at both events. The performances earned her a spot at the senior New Zealand team, the "Football Ferns", for the 2011 FIFA Women's World Cup. Nayler was the only uncapped member of New Zealand's squad and did not feature in the tournament. She was also a standby player for the 2012 Olympics.

Nayler's eventual senior début happened at the 2013 Cyprus Cup, in a 2–0 win over Italy.

She played all three matches of New Zealand at the 2015 FIFA Women's World Cup in Canada. Nayler was chosen as Player of the Match during her second game, as she kept a clean sheet in a 0–0 tie with the hosts in Edmonton.

In 2015, Nayler was captain of Northern Football as they won the National Women's League, the top-flight women's football tournament of New Zealand. She also played for Norwest United of the Northern League. In 2016, Northern Football manager Paul Greig had become assistant coach of Sky Blue FC, in the United States' National Women's Soccer League, and led his new team to sign Nayler. However, she was released by Sky Blue after 26 days and no games played, and Sky Blue signed another outfielder instead.

Nayler then hoped to use the 2016 Olympics, where she was again the Ferns' starting goalie, to see if she attracted the attention of any foreign clubs. In the Olympics, Nayler had a clean sheet in New Zealand's second game, a defeat of Colombia by 1–0, but the Ferns fell in the group stage following defeats to the United States and France.

Shortly after the Games, Nayler signed a two-year contract with Olympique Lyonnais of France. In 2017 she was loaned to women's team of Grenoble Foot 38, who played the Division 2, after seeing no playing time as the third goalkeeper. For the 2017–18 season, Nayler signed with the female squad of FC Girondins de Bordeaux, who played in the Division 1. At the end of her first season, where Bordeaux finished seventh, Nayler renewed her contract for an additional two years.

In April 2019, Nayler was named to the final 23-player squad for the 2019 FIFA Women's World Cup.

In August 2020, Nayler announced she had signed for FA Women's Super League club Reading. Unable to dislodge the incumbent goalkeeper Grace Moloney and unhappy at a lack of playing opportunities, Nayler left after one season.

On 27 October 2021, Damallsvenskan club Umeå IK announced the signing of Nayler ahead of their 2022 season.

Honours
Individual
 IFFHS OFC Woman Team of the Decade 2011–2020

References

External links

Profile at NZF

1992 births
Living people
Association footballers from Auckland
Division 1 Féminine players
Expatriate women's footballers in France
Footballers at the 2016 Summer Olympics
Indiana University – Purdue University Fort Wayne alumni
Massey University alumni
New Zealand expatriate women's association footballers
New Zealand expatriate sportspeople in the United States
New Zealand expatriate sportspeople in France
New Zealand women's association footballers
New Zealand women's international footballers
Olympic association footballers of New Zealand
Olympique Lyonnais Féminin players
Purdue Fort Wayne Mastodons women's soccer players
Women's association football goalkeepers
2015 FIFA Women's World Cup players
FC Girondins de Bordeaux (women) players
2019 FIFA Women's World Cup players
2011 FIFA Women's World Cup players
Footballers at the 2020 Summer Olympics
Reading F.C. Women players
People educated at Westlake Girls High School
Expatriate women's footballers in England
Expatriate women's footballers in Sweden
New Zealand expatriate sportspeople in England
Expatriate women's soccer players in the United States
New Zealand expatriate sportspeople in Sweden